This is a list of awards and nominations received by Filipino singer-songwriter Moira Rachelle Bustamante Cruzado Dela Torre, best known by her stage name Moira Dela Torre.

Awit Awards

Aliw Awards

Himig Handog

LionHearTV RAWR Awards

MTV Europe Music Awards

MOR Pinoy Music Awards

Myx Music Awards

PMPC Music Awards

PUSH Music Awards

TAG Awards Chicago

Village People Choice Award

Wish Music Awards

Other awards
Wishclusive Elite Circle—Bronze Award -  for reaching 10 million views on her "Malaya" radio performance on Wish 107.5 radio.
Wishclusive Elite Circle—Bronze Award -  for reaching 10 million views on her "Kung Di Rin Lang Ikaw" radio performance on Wish 107.5 with December Avenue.
Wishclusive Elite Circle-Silver Award  for reaching 25 million views on her "Kung Di Rin Lang Ikaw" radio performance on Wish 107.5 with December Avenue.

References 

Lists of awards received by Filipino musician